is a JR West Geibi station located in Nanatsuka-chō, Shōbara, Hiroshima Prefecture, Japan. The station features one side platform.

History
1987-04-01: Japan National Railways is privatized, and Nanatsuka Station becomes a JR West station

Around the station

Japan National Route 183
Hiroshima Prefectural Route 441 (Nanatsuka Mirasaka Route)

Connecting lines
All lines are JR West lines.
Geibi Line
Bingo-Mikkaichi Station — Nanatsuka Station — Yamanouchi Station

External links
 JR West
 Bihoku Kyūryō State Park

Geibi Line
Railway stations in Hiroshima Prefecture
Railway stations in Japan opened in 1923
Shōbara, Hiroshima